The 1979 Gloucester City Council election took place on 5 May 1979 to elect members of Gloucester City Council in England.

Results 

|}

Ward results

Barnwood

Barton

Eastgate

Hucclecote

Kingsholm

Linden

Longlevens

Matson

Podsmead

Tuffley

Westgate

References

1979 English local elections
1979
1970s in Gloucestershire